"Hell on Wheels" is a phrase that originally described the collection of business locations, such as gambling houses, which followed the builders of the First Transcontinental Railroad in the US, in the 1860s.

Hell on Wheels may also refer to:

People
 Thomas Hellriegel (born 1971), German triathlete nicknamed "Hell on Wheels"

Arts, entertainment, and media

Films
 Hell on Wheels (1967 film), a car racing film starring Marty Robbins as himself
 Hell on Wheels (2004 film), a film about the Tour de France
 Hell on Wheels (2007 film), a film about the sport of roller derby

Music
Groups and labels
 Hell on Wheels (band), a Swedish indie rock band
Albums
 Hell on Wheels (album), an album by Manowar
Songs
 "Hell on Wheels" (song), a 1979 song by Cher from Prisoner
 "Hell on Wheels", a song by Betty Blowtorch from Are You Man Enough?
 "Hell on Wheels", a song by Cinderella from Night Songs

Television
Series
 Hell on Wheels (TV series), a 2011–2016 AMC television series set during the building of the First Transcontinental Railroad in the US
Episodes
 "Hell on Wheels" (episode), the pilot episode of the above series
 "Hell on Wheels", season 4, episode 11 of Dr. Quinn, Medicine Woman television series

Interactive
 Full Throttle: Hell on Wheels, a canceled sequel to the video game Full Throttle (1995)

Military
 2nd Armored Division (United States), nicknamed "Hell on Wheels"

See also
 "Helen Wheels", a Paul McCartney song